Brendan Croker (born 15 August 1953 in Bradford, Yorkshire, England) is an English musician, who has recorded albums under his own name and with occasional backing band; The Five O'Clock Shadows. He was also a member of The Notting Hillbillies. During the late 1980s, he was an auxiliary member of The Mekons and a full-time member of Sally Timms and the Drifting Cowgirls.

He has recorded with Eric Clapton, Tanita Tikaram, Mark Knopfler, Kevin Coyne, and Chet Atkins.

Albums
With the 5 O'Clock Shadows
 Central Station Hotel (1985)
 A Close Shave (1986)
 Boat Trips in the Bay (1987)
 Live at the Front Page: The Official Bootleg (1987)
 Brendan Croker and The 5 O'Clock Shadows (1989)

With Guy Fletcher
 On The Big Hill (1988)

With The Notting Hillbillies
 Missing...Presumed Having a Good Time (1990)

With the Serious Offenders
 Time Off (1992)
 Made in Europe (1993)

With Kevin Coyne
 Life Is Almost Wonderful (2002)

As a solo artist
 Country Blues Guitar (1990)
 The Great Indoors (1991)
 Redneck State of The Art (1995)
 The Kershaw Sessions (1995)
 Three Chord Lovesongs (1996)
 Not Just A Hillbilly... More Like a Best of Brendan Croker (2000)

References

External links

 Website

1953 births
Living people
Musicians from Bradford
English pop musicians
English session musicians
The Notting Hillbillies members